Optical rotatory dispersion is the variation in the optical rotation of a substance with a change in the wavelength of light. Optical rotatory dispersion can be used to find the absolute configuration of metal complexes. For example, when plane-polarized white light from an overhead projector is passed through a cylinder of sucrose solution, a spiral rainbow is observed perpendicular to the cylinder.

Principles of operation 
When white light passes through a polarizer, the extent of rotation of light depends on its wavelength. Short wavelengths are rotated more than longer wavelengths, per unit of distance. Because the wavelength of light determines its color, the variation of color with distance through the tube is observed. This dependence of specific rotation on wavelength is called optical rotatory dispersion. 
In all materials the rotation varies with wavelength. The variation is caused by two quite different phenomena. The first accounts in most cases for the majority of the variation in rotation and should not strictly be termed rotatory dispersion. It depends on the fact that optical activity is actually circular birefringence. In other words, a substance which is optically active transmits right circularly polarized light with a different velocity from left circularly polarized light.
 
In addition to this pseudodispersion which depends on the material thickness, there is a true rotatory dispersion which depends on the variation with wavelength of the indices of refraction for right and left circularly polarized light.
 
For wavelengths that are absorbed by the optically active sample, the two circularly polarized components will be absorbed to differing extents. This unequal absorption is known as circular dichroism. Circular dichroism causes incident linearly polarized light to become elliptically polarized. The two phenomena are closely related, just as are ordinary absorption and dispersion. If the entire optical rotatory dispersion spectrum is known, the circular dichroism spectrum can be calculated, and vice versa.

Chirality 
In order for a molecule (or crystal) to exhibit circular birefringence and circular dichroism, it must be distinguishable from its mirror image. An object that cannot be superimposed on its mirror image is said to be chiral, and optical rotatory dispersion and circular dichroism are known as chiroptical properties.
 
Most biological molecules have one or more chiral centers and undergo enzyme-catalyzed transformations that either maintain or invert the chirality at one or more of these centers. Still other enzymes produce new chiral centers, always with a high specificity. These properties account for the fact that optical rotatory dispersion and circular dichroism are widely used in organic and inorganic chemistry and in biochemistry.
 
In the absence of magnetic fields, only chiral substances exhibit optical rotatory dispersion and circular dichroism. In a magnetic field, even substances that lack chirality rotate the plane of polarized light, as shown by Michael Faraday. Magnetic optical rotation is known as the Faraday effect, and its wavelength dependence is known as magnetic optical rotatory dispersion. In regions of absorption, magnetic circular dichroism is observable.

See also 

 Circular dichroism
 Magnetic circular dichroism
 Absorption
 Enzyme
 Stereochemistry
 Polarimetry 
 Polarography
 Hyper Rayleigh Scattering Optical Activity
 Raman optical activity (ROA)

References

Polarization (waves)
Stereochemistry